Tony Carroll is the name of:

 Tony Carroll (psychotherapist) (1941–2015), psychotherapist in Houston, Texas
 Tony Carroll (footballer) (born 1906), Scottish footballer
 Tonie Carroll (born 1976), former rugby league footballer